Milborne St Andrew is a village and civil parish in the county of Dorset in southern England. In the 2011 census the parish had 472 dwellings, 453 households and a population of 1,062.

History
Its structure comprises two concentric enclosures, though parts have been damaged by cultivation and ploughing. Pieces of Roman ware were found within the site in the 19th century.

In 1086 in the Domesday Book Milborne St Andrew was recorded as Meleburne; it had 10 households, 4 ploughlands,  of meadow and one mill. It was in Puddletown Hundred and the lord and tenant-in-chief was Matthew of Mortagne.

There were originally two settlements within the parish: St Andrew to the south of the Dorchester-Blandford road, and Deverel to the north, though over time these coalesced into one settlement around where the road crosses the Milborne Brook. At the end of the 19th century St Andrew's ecclesiastical parish was enlarged by the addition of neighbouring Milborne Stileham to the south east (previously part of Bere Regis parish), though the civil parishes remained separate until 1933.

Governance
Milborne St Andrew is in the Abbey electoral ward, which also includes Winterborne Kingston, Winterborne Whitechurch, Milton Abbas and Hilton. The ward population in the 2011 census was 3,897. The ward is part of the constituency of North Dorset that is currently (2018) represented in the UK parliament by the Conservative Simon Hoare.

Amenities
There are a number of community facilities within the village, including an infants' school (Milborne St Andrew First School), a public house (the Royal Oak), a parish church (Church of England, dedicated to St Andrew and founded in 1069), and a sports club and pavilion, home of the Milborne Sports Football Club which was nominated Dorset FA Charter Club of the Year in 2008.  Milborne Sports Football Club also supports two youth teams. In May 2016 Milborne St Andrew (under 11) came second in the Dorset Youth League Cup.

Literary connections
Thomas Hardy described Milborne St Andrew as "Millpond St Jude's" in his novel Far From the Madding Crowd. Weatherby Castle is the 'tower' of Hardy's novel Two on a Tower.

Notable residents
John Morton, the 15th-century Lord Chancellor and Archbishop of Canterbury, was born at Milborne Stileham.

References

External links
Milborne St Andrew Parish Council

Villages in Dorset